Ted Lindsay is an ice hockey player.

Ted Lindsay may also refer to:

Ted Lindsay (politician)
Ted Lindsay Award

See also
Theodore Lindsey
Edward Lindsay (disambiguation)